ISCS may refer to:
 Cysteine desulfurase, an enzyme
 NFS1, human cysteine desulfurase
 Shared-cost service